Paulo Ricardo may refer to:

 Paulo Ricardo (musician) (born 1962), Brazilian musician
 Padre Paulo Ricardo (born 1967), Brazilian priest and television host
 Paulo Ricardo (footballer, born 1987), Brazilian football right-back
 Paulo Ricardo (footballer, born 1994), Brazilian football centre-back